Chatham Area Transit is the provider of public transportation in the Savannah, Georgia, metropolitan area. The Authority was founded in 1987, evolving from previous transit providers. Services operate seven days a week and 90% of county residents are within reasonable walking distance of a bus route.

The downtown shuttles are known as the dot.

Fixed-route list

There are currently 17 fixed routes:

3 West Chatham
3B Augusta Ave / Garden City / Hudson Hill
4 Barnard
6 Cross Town
10 East Savannah
11 Candler
12 Henry
14 Abercorn Local
17 Silk Hope
20 Skidaway Island / Coffee Bluff
25 MLK Jr. Blvd / Westlake Apts
27 Waters
28 Waters
29 West Gwinnett / Cloverdale
31 Skidaway / Sandfly
80 Tiger Shuttle 
100X Airport Express

Fare-free downtown Savannah services

There are currently three free downtown (dot) shuttles:

 Forsyth Loop
 Downtown Loop
 Savannah Belles Ferry

The Downtown Loop was amended in January 2022 to incorporate sections of Abercorn Street, East Liberty Street and East Oglethorpe Avenue, with new stops added at Price and East Liberty Streets and East Broad Street near East Bryan Street. It would no longer serve the eastern end of Bryan and Congress Streets.

CAT bike stations
Rivers Exchange - 610 W. Oglethorpe Ave.
Ellis Square - 31 Barnard St.

References

Transportation in Savannah, Georgia
Bus transportation in Georgia (U.S. state)
Transportation in Chatham County, Georgia
Transit agencies in Georgia (U.S. state)